Raymond Samuel Tomlinson (April 23, 1941 – March 5, 2016) was an American computer programmer who implemented the first email program  on the ARPANET system, the precursor to the Internet, in 1971; It was the first system able to send mail between users on different hosts connected to ARPANET. Previously, mail could be sent only to others who used the same computer. To achieve this, he used the @ sign to separate the user name from the name of their machine, a scheme which has been used in email addresses ever since. The Internet Hall of Fame in its account of his work commented "Tomlinson's email program brought about a complete revolution, fundamentally changing the way people communicate."  He is credited with the invention of the TCP three-way handshake  which underlies HTTP and many other key Internet protocols.

Early life and education
Tomlinson was born in Amsterdam, New York, but his family soon moved to the small, unincorporated village of Vail Mills, Broadalbin, New York. He attended Broadalbin Central School in nearby Broadalbin, New York. Later he attended Rensselaer Polytechnic Institute (RPI) in Troy, New York where he participated in the co-op program with IBM. He received a bachelor's degree in electrical engineering from RPI in 1963.

After graduating from RPI, he entered the Massachusetts Institute of Technology (MIT) to continue his electrical engineering education. At MIT, Tomlinson worked in the Speech Communication Group and developed an analog-digital hybrid speech synthesizer as the subject of his thesis for the master's degree in electrical engineering, which he received in 1965.'Career
In 1967, he joined the technology company of Bolt, Beranek and Newman (now BBN Technologies), where he helped develop the TENEX operating system including the ARPANET Network Control Program, implementations of Telnet, and implementations on the self-replicating programs Creeper and Reaper. He wrote a file transfer program called CPYNET to transfer files through the ARPANET. Tomlinson was asked to change a program called SNDMSG, which sent messages to other users of a time-sharing computer, to run on TENEX. He added code he took from CPYNET to SNDMSG so messages could be sent to users on other computers—the first email.

The first email Tomlinson sent was a test. It was not preserved and Tomlinson describes it as insignificant, something like "QWERTYUIOP." This is commonly misquoted as "The first e-mail was QWERTYUIOP."  Tomlinson later commented that these "test messages were entirely forgettable and I have, therefore, forgotten them."

At first, his email messaging system was not considered important. Its development was not a directive of his employer, with Tomlinson merely pursuing it "because it seemed like a neat idea." When showing the system to a colleague, Tomlinson said "Don't tell anyone! This isn't what we're supposed to be working on."

Tomlinson said he preferred "email" over "e-mail,"joking in a 2010 interview that "I'm simply trying to conserve the world's supply of hyphens" and that "the term has been in use long enough to drop the hyphen".

Death
Tomlinson died at his home in Lincoln, Massachusetts, on March 5, 2016, from a heart attack. He was 74 years old.

Awards and honors
 In 2000 he received the George R. Stibitz Computer Pioneer Award from the American Computer Museum (with the Computer Science Department of Montana State University).
 In 2001 he received a Webby Award from the International Academy of Digital Arts and Sciences for lifetime achievement. Also in 2001 he was inducted into the Rensselaer Alumni Hall of Fame.
 In 2002 Discover'' magazine awarded him its Innovative Innovating Award of Innovation.
 In 2004, he received the IEEE Internet Award along with Dave Crocker.
 In 2009, he along with Martin Cooper was awarded the Prince of Asturias Award for scientific and technical research.
 In 2011, he was listed 4th in the MIT150 list of the top 150 innovators and ideas from MIT.
 In 2012, Tomlinson was inducted into the Internet Hall of Fame by the Internet Society.
 In 2022, Email Day, an annual, national holiday was established in honor of Ray Tomlinson and his creation of email. April 23 (Tomlinson's birthday) was chosen.

Notes

Further reading

External links
 Tomlinsons' e-mail webpage

1941 births
2016 deaths
American computer programmers
American electrical engineers
20th-century American inventors
Email
MIT School of Engineering alumni
People from Amsterdam, New York
Rensselaer Polytechnic Institute alumni
Webby Award winners
Engineers from New York (state)
Inventors from New York (state)